Everything's Alright may refer to:

Everything's Alright (album), a 1997 album by Charlie Major
"Everything's Alright" (The Newbeats song), 1964
"Everything's Alright" (The Mojos song), 1964
"Everything's Alright" (Jesus Christ Superstar song), 1971
Everything's Alright (film), a 1978 Brazilian comedy film

See also
"Everything Is Alright", a 2005 song by Motion City Soundtrack